Typhoon Chan-hom, known in the Philippines as Typhoon Falcon, was a large, powerful and long-lived tropical cyclone that affected most countries in the western Pacific basin. The ninth named storm of the 2015 Pacific typhoon season, Chan-hom developed on June 29 from a westerly wind burst that also spawned Tropical Cyclone Raquel in the southern hemisphere. Chan-hom slowly developed while moving to the northwest, aided by warm waters but disrupted by wind shear. The storm meandered near the Northern Marianas Islands, passing over the island of Rota before beginning a steady northwest track. While near the island, the storm dropped heavy rainfall on neighboring Guam, causing flooding and minor power outages. Chan-hom intensified into a typhoon on July 7, and two days later passed between the Japanese islands of Okinawa and Miyako-jima. There, strong winds left 42,000 people without power, while 27 people were injured. Around that time, the storm caused a surge in the monsoon trough, in conjunction with Tropical Storm Linfa, which caused flooding and killed 16 people in the Philippines.

It passed north of Taiwan, where it brought beneficial rainfall that replenished reservoirs. On July 11, Chan-hom became the strongest typhoon to make landfall in the Chinese province of Zhejiang. About 1.1 million people were evacuated ahead of the storm, and across the country, the storm left ¥9.84 billion (US$1.58 billion) in damage, as well as one death. Later, the storm turned to the northeast toward the Korean Peninsula. Jeju Island offshore South Korea recorded  of rainfall, and one person died due to a thunderstorm in the country. On July 12, the storm struck the Ongjin peninsula in North Korea, and became an extratropical cyclone shortly thereafter. The remnants later caused flooding and power outages in the Russian Far East.

Meteorological history

During June 2015, a near record strength pulse in the Madden–Julian oscillation, lead to a period of significant weather across the Western Pacific. This significant weather included a major westerly wind burst during late June, which caused a set of twin tropical cyclones to develop. The first tropical cyclone developed in the Southern Hemisphere during June 28, before it later developed into Tropical Cyclone Raquel during June 30.

Drifting generally northward, the disturbance slowly organized within a region of low to moderate wind shear and favorable outflow aloft. The circulation was enhanced by a surge of westerly winds to the south. At 06:00 UTC on June 29, the Japan Meteorological Agency (JMA) classified the system as a tropical depression. Convection steadily deepened over the center and banding features began consolidating around the periphery. On June 30, the JMA upgraded the cyclone to Tropical Storm Chan-hom. The JTWC assessed Chan-hom to be slightly weaker at this time, initiating it as a tropical depression.

Situated along the southern periphery of a subtropical ridge, Chan-hom moved steadily to the west. Upper-level ventilation allowed for growth of the cyclone, but moderate wind shear displaced the center from the deepest convection for much of July 1. That day, the JMA upgraded the system to a severe tropical storm. Early on July 2, the large circulation of Chan-hom absorbed a smaller disturbance to its southeast, and the storm turned to the west-southwest. Dvorak satellite classifications indicated that the system reached typhoon intensity following an expansion of the central dense overcast; the JTWC classified Chan-hom as such by 15:00 UTC, although the JMA maintained it as a severe tropical storm. Shortly thereafter, strong wind shear from a tropical upper tropospheric trough (TUTT) cell to the northeast dramatically weakened the storm. Convection was stripped away from Chan-hom's center and the storm's forward motion abruptly slowed. Alongside the shear, subsidence over the cyclone, a trough to the north, and a remnant vortex to the northeast all served to suppress convection.

Coinciding with Chan-hom's abrupt collapse on July 3, the system turned northeast as it entered a weakness in the steering ridge. Later that day, the broad circulation turned north-northwest. Wind shear eased early on July 4 as the TUTT cell retreated to the north and the subtropical ridge steadily re-established itself. Convection started redeveloping over the tropical storm. Late on July 4 into July 5, the center of Chan-hom skirted the southern coast of Rota in the Mariana Islands. While near the island, Chan-hom executed an unusual counter-clockwise loop owing to interaction with a monsoon trough. Once clear of the Mariana Islands, steady development ensued owing to low wind shear and good outflow. Early on July 7, Chan-hom attained typhoon intensity according to the JMA, following to a burst in central convection. Microwave satellite imagery indicated the formation of an eye as convection deepened and banding features tightened around the circulation.

On July 7, the typhoon entered the Philippine area of Responsibility and was assigned the local name Falcon. Chan-hom's eye briefly improved in structure before entering a state of flux and collapsing later that day; convection on the northern side of the storm diminished simultaneously. A large storm, gale-force winds extended  from Chan-hom's center on July 9. Late on July 9 into July 10, Chan-hom passed between the Japanese islands of Okinawa and Miyako-jima.

An eyewall replacement cycle and weakening convection along the northern side resulted in steady weakening starting on July 10. Increasing wind shear prevented the system from reorganizing as it neared East China. Early on July 11, the typhoon reached the southwestern edge of the subtropical ridge and began turning to the north and later north-northeast. Based on the JTWC estimate, Chan-hom was the strongest typhoon to pass within  of Shanghai in at least 35 years, and it was the strongest landfall in Zhejiang since recordkeeping began in 1949. Thereafter the storm accelerated north-northeast and moved over the cool waters of the Yellow Sea, prompting further degradation of its structure. Chan-hom weakened below typhoon-force around 18:00 UTC on July 11. The system's low-level center completely exposed on July 12 as it approached the Korean Peninsula. By 00:00 UTC on July 13 the system transitioned into an extratropical cyclone while retaining gale-force winds, and six hours later the system dissipated over north-central North Korea.

Preparations and impact

China

Due to the typhoon, about 1.1 million people evacuated from areas along the coast. Nearly 30,000 ships were called back to port, and 600 flights were canceled within the area. Over 100 train rides were also canceled, and portions of the Shanghai Metro was shut down. The storm caused a concert for Chinese singer Wang Feng to be canceled.

Gusts were strongest along the coast and along offshore islands. The storm produced high waves from Fujian to Jiangsu provinces, reaching five storeys high in Wenling, washing fish ashore and flooding the coast.

Winds from Chan-hom were strong enough to knock down street signs across Zhejiang, as well as destroying an unoccupied building in Cixi City. The storm's heavy rainfall caused a landslide in Ningbo and necessitated flood gates to be opened. Also in the city, storm rains caused a hotel roof to collapse, killing one person and injuring two. Throughout Zhejiang, Chan-hom wrecked 700 homes and damaged another 1,400. In neighboring Jiangsu, 300 homes were damaged or destroyed, causing ¥120 million (US$19.3 million) in economic losses. The storm wrecked greenhouses and irrigation systems while also damaging crops. In the Nanhui District of Shanghai, 20% of peaches and 40% of pears were lost after being damaged by the storm's winds. In Shanghai, the winds knocked down over 3,000 trees. The high agriculture damage – estimated at ¥3.62 billion (US$582.9 million) – was mostly due to the typhoon's concurrence with the local harvesting of vegetables and melons. Overall, Chan-hom affected 3.9 million people in eastern China, causing about ¥9.84 billion (US$1.58 billion) in damage.

Elsewhere
Before the storm affected the Marianas Islands, the National Weather Service issued a typhoon watch and tropical storm warning for Guam and Rota, as well as a typhoon warning for Tinian, and Saipan. The United States Department of Defense issued a Condition of Readiness 3. On Guam, the storm caused minor power outages and flooding.

Although Chan-hom did not directly affect the Philippines, both Chan-hom and Tropical Storm Linfa enhanced the monsoon for several days, which caused severe flooding throughout the country. Heavy rains impacted portions of Luzon and the Western Visayas, with various events resulting in five deaths. Four people also went missing when their boat sank amid strong winds off the coast of Pangasinan. A brief tornado caused minor damage in Iba, Zambales. Nearly 34,000 people were affected by the monsoon event, which killed 16 people and caused ₱3.9 million (US$86,000) in agricultural losses.

On July 9, the outer rainbands of Chan-hom began affecting the Japanese island of Okinawa. Between July 9 and 10, 326 flights were canceled at Naha Airport, affecting more than 32,000 people. A total of 176 people sought refuge in public shelters. American military bases on the island were placed under Condition of Readiness 1, the highest level. At the height of the storm, 42,000 people lost power across Okinawa Prefecture. The storm injured 27 people in Okinawa, three seriously. Two buildings were damaged. Agricultural damage across Okinawa reached ¥524 million (US$4.27 million), most of which was sustained by the mango crop.

Passing north of Taiwan, the threat of Chan-hom caused the Taiwan Stock Exchange and other public buildings to close, as well as canceling several flights. The storm brought ultimately heavy rainfall, reaching  in Taipei. The Shihmen Dam, which had dropped to 55% capacity before the storm, rose to 90.26% of its capacity due to the storm's rains.

In South Korea, 574 flights were canceled and 163 boats were forced to remain at port. The large circulation of the storm dropped heavy rainfall throughout the Korean Peninsula, beneficial in easing drought conditions. Notably, Mount Halla on the offshore Jeju Island recorded  of rainfall during Chan-hon's passage. Wind gusts reached  in Muan County in southwestern South Korea. Thunderstorms killed one person in the country.

The winds downed numerous trees, some of which fell on cars, and uprooted tombs in a graveyard in Khabarovsk. The towns of Bikin, Sovetskaya Gavan, and Vyazma, saw  of rain or roughly 60–70 percent of their average monthly precipitation for July during the storm's passage. Power and telephone service was lost in 34 communities. Ferry service between Vanino and Kholmsk was suspended, temporarily stranding 1,300 passengers.

See also

Typhoon Saomai
Typhoon Haikui
Typhoon Abe (1990)
Typhoon Winnie (1997)

Notes

References

External links
JMA General Information of Typhoon Chan-hom (1509) from Digital Typhoon

2015 Pacific typhoon season
2015 disasters in China
2015 in Japan
2015 in North Korea
2015 disasters in South Korea
2015 in Guam
2015 in the Northern Mariana Islands
Typhoons
Typhoons in China
Typhoons in Japan
Typhoons in North Korea
Typhoons in South Korea
Typhoons in Guam
Typhoons in the Northern Mariana Islands
Tropical cyclones in 2015
2015 disasters in Asia